Brooks Regional Aerodrome  is located  north northwest of Brooks, Alberta, Canada.

References

External links
Brooks Airport on COPA's Places to Fly airport directory

Registered aerodromes in Alberta
Brooks, Alberta
County of Newell